Ball back is a piece of terminology in both codes of rugby football.

In both codes of rugby, if the ball enters touch, then play is restarted (either by a line-out in rugby union or a scrum in rugby league) level with the point where the ball left the field of play.  The exception to this is if the ball is kicked into touch without first bouncing inside the field of play (on the full).  In this case, the scrum or line-out is taken from level with the place from where the ball was kicked, and not from where it entered touch.

Ball back is waived in certain circumstances:

If a side elects to kick a penalty into touch
If the kicking player is inside his own 22m line when he kicks the ball, and (under the ELVs) the ball has not been immediately passed or run back into the 22 (rugby union only)

See also
 Line-out (rugby union)
 Penalty (rugby)
 Scrum (rugby)

References

Rugby league terminology
Rugby union terminology